Ohara is an American police procedural television series that first aired on the ABC television network from January 17, 1987, until May 7, 1988, starring Pat Morita in the title role of Lt. Ohara. Morita also co-created the series along with Michael Braveman and John A. Kuri. Kevin Conroy, Jon Polito, Rachel Ticotin, and Robert Clohessy also starred in supporting roles. The series was notable for being one of the first television series to have a Japanese-American actor in the leading role.

Premise
The series focuses on an unconventional Los Angeles-based Japanese American police lieutenant named Ohara (Pat Morita) who uses spirituality methods such as meditation in his home shrine to solve crimes without the use of a gun or a partner, although he would use martial arts if necessary. He often talked in the form of epigrams. He was later paired with a partner named Lt. George Shaver (Robert Clohessy) who was a more conventional cop.

Main cast
Pat Morita as Lt. Ohara
Season 1
Kevin Conroy as Capt. Lloyd Hamilton(episode 1-7)
Jon Polito as Capt. Ross(episode 8-11)
Madge Sinclair as Gussie Lemmons
Catherine Keener as Lt. Cricket Sideris
Richard Yniguez as Det. Jesse Guerrera

Season 2
Robert Clohessy as Lt. George Shaver
Rachel Ticotin as Asst. U.S. Atty. Teresa Storm
Meagen Fay as Roxy

Notable guest stars
Brandon Lee appeared in the Season 2 episode "What's in a Name" which first aired on January 23, 1988 as Kenji, the evil son of a yakuza godfather. This was Lee's first and only appearance in a television series and his only acting role as a villain, although in Kung Fu: The Movie, his character was possessed and forced to be evil for most of the movie.
Other guest stars in the series included Michael Des Barres, Nana Visitor, Mitch Pileggi, Benicio del Toro, and Shannon Tweed.

Episodes list

Season 1 (1987)

Season 2 (1987–88)

Format changes and cancellation
Following its premiere, the show was not attracting the audience ABC had hoped for. They put it through several format changes to increase the ratings. The first major change was to change title character Ohara from a lieutenant to a federal police officer; he was also paired with a partner. Later on in the season Ohara became a more conventional cop using a gun to assist him in his investigations. The second season had a final format change in which Ohara and his partner were turned into private investigators. These changes failed to improve the show's declining ratings and the show was cancelled after the second season.

External links
 
Review of Ohara at Thrilling Detective.com
Ohara Episode list and Summary on TV.com

1987 American television series debuts
1988 American television series endings
1980s American crime television series
Fictional portrayals of the Los Angeles Police Department
American Broadcasting Company original programming
Television series by Warner Bros. Television Studios
English-language television shows
Television series by Imagine Entertainment
Asian-American television